The Gibson L9-S Ripper is a model of electric bass guitar made by Gibson Guitar Corporation.

The Ripper was designed by Bill Lawrence, and manufactured from 1973 until 1983, the peak year being 1976. Most had a maple body with laminated maple neck; however a significant number manufactured in 1975 had lighter alder bodies while retaining the maple neck.  Also in 1975, an edgier and slimmer body, with more beveling and contours around the horns of the bass, was introduced. The new look was geared towards heavier music that was gaining popularity under the ending decade.
The later models of 1976 and on featured a different routing in the body for the wires, and the pickups were screwed in by three posts as opposed to the old two-post variation.

The Ripper was initially available in three colors: natural, black, and tobacco sunburst. Natural Rippers received a maple fingerboard, while black or sunburst basses received an ebony fingerboard. A handful of 1974 basses were finished in cherry sunburst, which was never listed as a standard finish option. These basses are extremely rare.

The headstocks were painted black and featured the "Gibson" logo in gold script. Most models feature a black pickguard, though closer inspection reveals that some pickguards only appear black and are actually a very dark tortoiseshell pattern. A few early basses were equipped with a bright red tortoiseshell pickguard.

The Ripper came equipped with two humbucking pickups designed especially for the Ripper by Bill Lawrence which were called "Super Humbuckers", and a four way pickup selector control.

There was also a fretless version of the Ripper – identical in all respects (fretboard aside).

The original Gibson model is now rare and has seen significant inflation in value recently; however a cheaper Epiphone model was still in production for a few years, it was featured with two single coil pickups rather than Gibson's Super Humbuckers.

Gibson re-introduced the Ripper in 2009 as the "Ripper II", with slightly different specs from the initial 1973–1983 run.  The reissue features a brass nut, unlike the original which was a composite material, it features a wrap-around tailpiece as opposed to a string-through-body design, and the Super Humbuckers were wired differently.  The 2009 Rippers feature two volume knobs, and one master tone, and a six-position selector switch for choosing between different pickup configurations . Original Rippers had one master volume, a mid-range notch filter (captor/inductor), and a treble roll-off knob, and a 4-position selector switch.

The Ripper is "cousin" to the Gibson Grabber and Gibson G3 models also manufactured by Gibson around the same time.  All three had the same body shape, but different appointments.  The Grabber had a different headstock and featured a sliding pickup that could be moved between the neck and bridge positions.  The G3 featured three single-coil pickups that could be selected in a variety of tonal options.  The "Grabber II" was also re-released in 2009. The Ripper used set-neck construction, while both the G3 and Grabber had bolt-on necks.

Notable users
 Mel Schacher - Grand Funk Railroad
 Rick Danko – The Band
 Carole Kaye
 Wylie Gelber – Dawes
 Krist Novoselic – Nirvana
 Gene Simmons – Kiss
  Mark Mendoza - The Dictators and Twisted Sister
 Gerald Casale – Devo
 Tiran Porter - The Doobie Brothers
 Peter Cetera – Chicago
 Louis Johnson – Brothers Johnson
 Suzi Quatro
 Jack Blades – Night Ranger
 Michael Shuman – Queens of the Stone Age
 Gordon Moakes – Young Legionnaire
 Greg Lake – Emerson, Lake and Palmer
 Matt Sharp – Weezer
 Mike Tilka – Max Webster
 Mikey Welsh – Weezer
 Mark Evans – AC/DC
 Chris Feinstein – Ryan Adams & The Cardinals
 Lou Barlow - Dinosaur Jr.
 Ted Mulry - Ted Mulry Gang
 Kyle Johnson - Misery Signals
 Marc Miller - Yezda Urfa
 Nate Mendel - Foo Fighters
 Joseph Pope III -  Nathaniel Rateliff and the Nightsweats
 Tom Wolk - Hall & Oates, the Saturday Night Live band
 Bobby Markos -  Cloakroom
 Tod Bowers - Davy Knowles

External links
 Gibson Limited Series – Gibson's Limited Series Run page

References

Ripper